The 2023 Tennessee Volunteers football team will represent the University of Tennessee in the Eastern Division of the Southeastern Conference (SEC) during the 2023 NCAA Division I FBS football season. The Volunteers are expected to be led by Josh Heupel in his third year as Tennessee's head coach. 

Tennessee  was ranked 10th by 247Sports in the 2023 college football recruiting class. 

The Tennessee football team plays its home games at Neyland Stadium in Knoxville, Tennessee.

Schedule

References

Tennessee
Tennessee Volunteers football seasons
Tennessee Volunteers football